The Century Theatre in Detroit shares a lobby with the Gem Theatre. The theatre has seating at cabaret tables, and the stage hosts quirky shows, such as Forbidden Broadway, Menopause the Musical, and Late Nite Catechism. The theatre building houses a restaurant, The Century Grille, and is a popular downtown Detroit destination for weddings and private events.

History
Built in 1903 by the Twentieth Century Association and opened on December 26, the theater was the first building in Detroit to have a building permit issued in a woman's name.  During The Depression,  the Association disbanded and the theater foreclosed.  The building housed a variety of businesses over the years until it finally closed in 1978.  in 1990, developer Charles Forbes began a renovation to restore it.  The Gem Theatre reopened on  December 31, 1991, only to close again in 1997.  Because of the fact it would be torn down due to Comerica Park, Forbes negotiated it so the theatre was moved five blocks away   November 10, 1997.  It broke the 1986 Guinness Book of World Records for the heaviest building moved on wheels

References

Further reading

External links
Gem and Century Theatres
 Photos at DETROIT: The Gem Theatre

Theatres in Detroit
Relocated buildings and structures in Michigan
Event venues established in 1903
1903 establishments in Michigan